This is a list of notable corporations headquartered in Los Angeles County, California. The table is arranged alphabetically by company.

References

Los Angeles County